Jonathan Coe  (born 19 August 1961) is an English novelist and writer. His work has an underlying preoccupation with political issues, although this serious engagement is often expressed comically in the form of satire. For example, What a Carve Up! (1994) reworks the plot of an old 1960s spoof horror film of the same name.  It is set within the "carve up" of the UK's resources that was carried out by Margaret Thatcher's Conservative governments of the 1980s.

Early life and education
Coe was born in Bromsgrove, Worcestershire, on 19 August 1961 to Roger and Janet (née Kay) Coe.  He studied at King Edward's School, Birmingham, and Trinity College, Cambridge.  He taught at the University of Warwick, where he completed an MA and PhD in English Literature.

Career
Coe has long been interested in both music and literature.  In the mid-1980s he played with a band (The Peer Group) and tried to get a recording of his music. He also wrote songs and played keyboards for a short-lived feminist cabaret group, Wanda and the Willy Warmers.

He published his first novel, The Accidental Woman, in 1987. In 1994 his fourth novel What a Carve Up! won the John Llewellyn Rhys Prize, and the Prix du Meilleur Livre Étranger in France. It was followed by The House of Sleep, which won the Writers' Guild of Great Britain Best Novel award and, in France, the Prix Médicis. As of 2022, Coe has published fourteen novels.

Besides novels, Coe has written a biography of the experimental British novelist B. S. Johnson, Like a Fiery Elephant, which D. J. Taylor described in Literary Review as "a deeply unconventional biography," won the Samuel Johnson Prize in 2005. Also in 2005 Penguin published his "collected shorter prose", a volume consisting of only 55 pages, under the title 9th & 13th. The same collection was published in France in 2012 under the title Désaccords imparfaits.

He has written a short children's adaptation of Gulliver's Travels by Jonathan Swift, and a children's story called The Broken Mirror. Both titles are published in Italy only, as La storia di Gulliver (2011) and Lo specchio dei desideri (2012).

A handwritten manuscript page from The Rotters' Club was displayed as part of the "Writing Britain: Wastelands to Wonderlands" exhibition that ran at the British Library during 2012.

Coe was a judge for the Booker Prize in 1996, and has been a jury member at the Venice Film Festival (in 1999, under the chairmanship of Emir Kusturica) and the Edinburgh Film Festival in 2007.

In 2012 Coe was invited by Javier Marías to become a duke of the kingdom of Redonda. He chose as his title "Duke of Prunes", after a favourite piece of music by Frank Zappa.

Coe read an excerpt of The Terrible Privacy of Maxwell Sim to crowds at the Latitude Festival in July 2009. The central character was to be "a product of the social media boom", and "the sort of person with hundreds of Facebook friends but no one to talk to when his marriage breaks up."

Coe's 2019 book Middle England won the European Book Prize and also won the Costa Book Award in the Novel category.

Film and TV adaptations
Both What a Carve Up! (1994) and The Rotters' Club (2001) have been adapted as drama serials for BBC Radio 4. What a Carve Up! was adapted by David Nobbs.  The Rotters' Club was adapted for television by Dick Clement and Ian La Frenais and broadcast on BBC Two in January–February 2005. The Dwarves of Death (1990) was filmed as Five Seconds to Spare in 1999, for which Coe himself co-wrote the screenplay.

The Very Private Life of Mister Sim, a French film based on The Terrible Privacy of Maxwell Sim, directed by Michel Leclerc and produced by Delante Cinema and Kare Productions, was released on 16 December 2015.

Musical collaborations

Music is a constant thread in Coe's work. He played music for years and tried to find a record label as a performer before becoming a published novelist. He had to wait until 2001 to make his first appearance on a record with 9th & 13th (Tricatel, 2001), a collection of readings of his work, set to music by jazz pianist/double bass player Danny Manners and indiepop artist Louis Philippe.

Coe is a lifelong fan of Canterbury progressive rock. His novel The Rotters' Club is named after an album by Hatfield and the North. He has contributed to the liner notes for that band's archival release Hatwise Choice. He once said: "I'd love to find a pianist to collaborate with – maybe Alex Maguire, who is now playing with the reformed line-up of Hatfield and the North". In fact this collaboration did come to fruition, at the Cheltenham Literature Festival in 2009, where Maguire performed a suite of piano pieces to accompany readings from the novel The Rain Before It Falls. Coe has also performed live with flautist Theo Travis.

Coe wrote the sleevenotes "Reflections on The High Llamas" for the 2003 compilation of The High Llamas Retrospective, Rarities and Instrumentals. He has also written lyrics for songs on the albums My Favourite Part of You and The Wonder of It All by Louis Philippe, and Earth to Ether by Theo Travis, for which the vocalist was Richard Sinclair.

In 2008 Coe wrote Say Hi to the Rivers and the Mountains, a 60-minute piece of what he calls "spoken musical theatre", with dialogue to be delivered continuously by three actors over a sequence of songs and instrumentals by The High Llamas. The work was premiered at the Analog Festival in Dublin that summer, and subsequently performed at various venues in the UK and Spain. The most recent performance was as part of the Notes and Letters Festival at Kings Place in London in September 2011, with Henry Goodman in the leading role of Bobby. The piece is inspired by the proposed demolition of Robin Hood Gardens, an East London council estate designed by Alison and Peter Smithson.

In March 2011, at the City Winery in New York, Coe took the keyboard solos on a live version of "Nigel Blows A Tune" from the Caravan album In the Land of Grey and Pink, along with the musician/novelist Wesley Stace and his band The English UK.

Personal life
Coe married Janine McKeown in 1989, and they have two daughters born in 1997 and 2000.

In 2009, Coe took part in Oxfam's first annual book festival, "Bookfest". Along with William Sutcliffe, Coe volunteered for the Oxfam Bloomsbury Bookshop in London on Thursday 9 July. Coe and Sutcliffe were each asked to choose a theme, and to find books from the stockroom to set up in the shop's window. Coe chose satire as the theme for his display. He chose books by or about Michael Moore, Bill Hicks, Peter Cook and Steve Bell. He also unearthed a script of Terry Gilliam’s film Brazil.

Coe donated a story to Oxfam's "Ox-Tales" project, four collections of UK stories written by 38 authors. Coe's story was published in the Earth collection.

He is a trustee of the charity Cleared Ground Demining, and in spring 2007 visited Guinea-Bissau to write an article about their operations there.

In a 2001 newspaper interview, Coe described himself as an atheist.

Honours and awards
 1994, John Llewellyn Rhys Prize (for What a Carve Up!)
 1995, Prix du Meilleur Livre Étranger
 1997, Writers' Guild of Great Britain Best Fiction Book
 1998, Prix Médicis Étranger (for The House of Sleep)
 2001, Bollinger Everyman Wodehouse Prize (for The Rotters' Club)
 2004, Chevalier of the Ordre des Arts et des Lettres
 2004, Premio Arcebispo Juan de San Clemente
 2005, Samuel Johnson Prize (for Like a Fiery Elephant)
 Honorary degrees: DLitt, University of Birmingham (2006); DLitt, University of Wolverhampton (2006); DUniv, Birmingham City University.
 2012, Fellow of the Royal Society of Literature
 2019, European Book Prize (for Middle England)
 2019, Costa Book Award - Novel (for Middle England)

Bibliography

Novels
The Accidental Woman, Duckworth, 1987
A Touch of Love, Duckworth, 1989
The Dwarves of Death, Fourth Estate, 1990
What a Carve Up! or The Winshaw Legacy, Viking, 1994 (winner of the 1994 John Llewellyn Rhys Prize)
The House of Sleep, Viking, 1997 (winner of the Prix Médicis)
The Rotters' Club, Viking, 2001 (winner of the Bollinger Everyman Wodehouse Prize).
The Closed Circle,  Viking, 2004
The Rain Before It Falls, Viking, 2007
The Terrible Privacy of Maxwell Sim, Viking, 2010
Expo 58, Viking, 2013
Number 11, Viking, 2015
Middle England, Viking, 2018
Mr Wilder and Me, Viking, 2020
Bournville, Viking, 2022

Books for children
La storia di Gulliver, L'espresso 2011
Lo specchio dei desideri, Feltrinelli 2012

Non-fiction
Humphrey Bogart: Take It and Like It, London: Bloomsbury, 1991
James Stewart: Leading Man, London: Bloomsbury, 1994
Like a Fiery Elephant: The Story of B. S. Johnson, London: Picador, 2004 (winner of the 2005 Samuel Johnson Prize for non-fiction)

References

External links
 Jonathan Coe's website and blog
 Closing the Circle: Jonathan Coe In Interview
 Online discussion about Jonathan Coe and B.S. Johnson
 
 A one-hour interview about his writing (France-Culture, Bibliothèque étrangère, Francesca Isidori)
 Jonathan Coe on Writing
 Audio Podcast on BBC4's Bookclub
 Jonathan Coe reading from "The Rain Before It Fall" at writLOUD
 Cleared Ground Demining official website

1961 births
Living people
Academics of the University of Warwick
Alumni of Trinity College, Cambridge
English atheists
English biographers
English male non-fiction writers
English satirists
Fellows of the Royal Society of Literature
John Llewellyn Rhys Prize winners
New Statesman people
People educated at King Edward's School, Birmingham
People from Bromsgrove
Prix Médicis étranger winners